Mathias Jattah-Njie Jørgensen (born 23 April 1990), also known by his mononymous nickname Zanka, is a Danish professional footballer who plays as a centre-back for  club Brentford and the Denmark national team.

Jørgensen began his career at boyhood club FC Copenhagen, playing regularly in five Superliga seasons, before a move to PSV Eindhoven in 2012, where he spent two seasons in the Eredivisie before returning to Denmark after finding his chances limited. He joined Premier League club Huddersfield Town in July 2017 for a fee of £3.5 million, where he played until their relegation in 2019. Afterwards, he played for Fenerbahçe, before returning to the Premier League in 2021 where he signed with Brentford.

Formerly an international at under-16, under-17, under-18 and under-21 level, Jørgensen made his senior international debut for Denmark aged 18 in November 2008.

Club career

FC Copenhagen
Born to a Danish mother and a Gambian father, Jørgensen moved to FC Copenhagen from neighbouring club B.93, where he had played in first-team matches even at the young age of 16. He signed a three-year contract with FCK on 26 June 2007. Before signing with the Danish champions, he had visited Arsenal for a one-week trial.

On 21 July 2007, Jørgensen strained the inner ligament in the left knee in a reserve team match – less than a month after he moved to the club. On 9 September, he played again for the reserve team. His first team debut came on 26 September 2007 in a cup match against FC Fredericia. He substituted Oscar Wendt five minutes before full-time, in the match FCK won 3–1. Three days later he got his Superliga debut, this time replacing Hjalte Nørregaard about 15 minutes before full-time.

Only eight days after his first team debut, Jørgensen was thrown on pitch in the extra time of the UEFA Cup first round second leg at Parken Stadium against RC Lens, after captain Michael Gravgaard had received a red card. He was substituted for Marcus Allbäck and played in the central defence together with Brede Hangeland, and they prevented any more goals for Lens, when they were 10 against 11.

On 19 November 2008, he made his debut for the Danish national football team in a friendly against Wales.

After Roland Nilsson became manager for Copenhagen he became captain for "The Lions". 22 February 2012 it was announced that Jørgensen would join Dutch club PSV Eindhoven on a free transfer during the summer transfer window.

PSV
Jørgensen was featured in an unofficial pre-season tournament, The Polish Masters, in July 2012 and scored his first goal for PSV in their game against S.L. Benfica on 22 July. However, he struggled to break into PSV's first XI and only played 14 matches for the club over the course of two years.

Return to FC Copenhagen
On 7 July 2014, Jørgensen returned to his former team FC Copenhagen for a fee of around 600,000 Euros.

Huddersfield Town
On 7 July 2017, Huddersfield Town confirmed the signing of Jørgensen from FC Copenhagen for £3.5 million on a three-year contract. Jørgensen made 65 total appearances for the Terriers in his two seasons with the club as they suffered relegation to the Championship after the 2018–19 season.

Fenerbahçe
On 10 August 2019, Huddersfield Town confirmed that the defender had joined Fenerbahçe on a permanent deal. The terms of the transfer were undisclosed.

On 31 January 2020, Jørgensen joined Fortuna Düsseldorf on loan until the end of the 2019–20 season.

On 5 October 2020, Jørgensen again returned to F.C. Copenhagen on loan until the end of the 2020–21 season.

Brentford
On 9 September 2021, Jørgensen joined Premier League club Brentford on a one-year contract. During an injury-hit 2021–22 season, made 10 appearances and scored one goal. After his contract expired in June 2022, it was announced by the club that, whilst he would depart as an official squad member, he would be allowed to train with them in order to complete his rehabilitation on an adductor injury and enable him to find a new club. In July 2022, he joined the club's pre-season training camp in Germany, and on 22 August 2022 signed a new one-year contract with an option for an extra year.

International career
In May 2018 he was named in Denmark's preliminary 35-man squad for the 2018 FIFA World Cup in Russia. In the round of 16 against Croatia, he scored the opening goal in the first minute of the match. In the 116th minute, he commit a professional foul in the penalty area to prevent Croatia from scoring a late winning goal, and was subsequently yellow carded. His tackle temporarily paid off as Danish goalkeeper Kasper Schmeichel saved Luka Modrić's penalty kick, maintaining the 1–1 draw and forcing the match into a penalty shootout. However, Denmark would go on to lose the shootout 3–2.

In May 2021, he was named in Denmark's preliminary 26-man squad for the UEFA Euro 2020.

Personal life
Jørgensen dated Hungarian model Enikő Mihalik.

Jørgensen wrote an article against homophobia in football for the Danish Football Player’s Association in 2016. In February 2017, following the monetary settlement that the players association had with the Danish national team, Jørgensen donated the 667,000 Danish kroner ($94,380) to help fund a new pro-LGBT+ campaign called “Fodbold for alle’ or ‘Football for all’ and visited schools to talk about the problem of homophobia.

Nickname
Jørgensen received his nickname "Zanka" from the film Cool Runnings, in which the character played by Doug E. Doug is named Sanka. The nickname was coined by Johan Lange in 2000, while both Lange and Jørgensen were playing for B.93. Lange would go on to be one of the assistant managers during Jørgensen's first spell at FC Copenhagen, and he would later serve as the technical director when Jørgensen returned to the club in 2014.

Career statistics

Club

International

Scores and results list Denmark's goal tally first, score column indicates score after each Jørgensen goal.

Honours
FC Copenhagen
 Danish Superliga: 2008–09, 2009–10, 2010–11, 2015–16, 2016–17
 Danish Cup: 2008–09, 2011–12, 2014–15, 2015–16, 2016–17

Individual
 Players' Talent of the Year: 2008
 Arla Talent of the Year: 2008
 Arla U-19 National Team Talent of the Year: 2008
 F.C. Copenhagen Player of the Year: 2017

References

External links
Profile at the Brentford F.C. website

Mathias Jørgensen at Voetbal International 

1990 births
Living people
Footballers from Copenhagen
Danish men's footballers
Denmark youth international footballers
Denmark under-21 international footballers
Denmark international footballers
Danish people of Gambian descent
Association football defenders
Boldklubben af 1893 players
F.C. Copenhagen players
PSV Eindhoven players
Jong PSV players
Huddersfield Town A.F.C. players
Fortuna Düsseldorf players
Fenerbahçe S.K. footballers
Danish Superliga players
Eredivisie players
Eerste Divisie players
Premier League players
Süper Lig players
2018 FIFA World Cup players
UEFA Euro 2020 players
Danish expatriate men's footballers
Expatriate footballers in the Netherlands
Expatriate footballers in England
Expatriate footballers in Turkey
Expatriate footballers in Germany
Danish expatriate sportspeople in the Netherlands
Danish expatriate sportspeople in England